Franz Seitz may refer to:

 Franz Seitz Sr. (1887–1952), German film director
 Franz Seitz Jr. (1921–2006), German film producer

See also 
 Franz von Seitz (1817–1883), German painter, lithographer, engraver and costume designer as well as an art teacher and theatre director